Florina Fernandes, nicknamed Fefe, is a retired Romanian television presenter, news anchor and actress. She is of African descent through her father. Fernandes was the first exotic appearance in the country show business, at least after the Romanian Revolution of 1989.

Filmography

References 

21st-century Romanian actresses
Romanian television presenters
Living people
Romanian people of African descent
Year of birth missing (living people)
Place of birth missing (living people)
Romanian film actresses
Romanian women television presenters